Mitochondrial fission is the process where mitochondria divide or segregate into two separate mitochondrial organelles. Mitochondrial fission is counteracted by the process of mitochondrial fusion, whereby two separate mitochondria can fuse together to form a large one. Mitochondrial fusion in turn can result in elongated mitochondrial networks. Both mitochondrial fission and fusion are balanced in the cell, and mutations interfering with either processes are associated with a variety of diseases. Mitochondria can divide by prokaryotic binary fission and since they require mitochondrial DNA for their function, fission is coordinated with DNA replication. Some of the proteins that are involved in mitochondrial fission have been identified and some of them are associated with mitochondrial diseases. Mitochondrial fission has significant implications in stress response and apoptosis.

Mechanism

FtsZ Localization
The FtsZ protein (a homologue to eukaryotic tubulin), found in many bacteria and some archaea, plays a role in mitochondrial fission. The Min system plays a role in localizing and assembling FtsZ proteins into a ring around the center of the mitochondria and some proteins tethered to the inner mitochondrial membrane also help anchor the Z ring. The Z ring is anchored at the site of constriction where division will take place. The Z ring acts as a scaffold for the deposition of septum, and it is aided in this by the proteins by FtsW, FtsI and FtsN. The translocase FtsK helps move the mtDNA away from the site of constriction.

Drp1
The Drp1 protein is a member of the dynamin family of large GTPases, transcribed from the DNM1L gene and alternative splicing leads to at least ten isoforms of Drp1 for tissue-specific fission regulation. Drp1 is involved in the fission of both mitochondria and peroxisomes. The folded Drp1 monomer contains four regions: a head, neck, stalk, and tail. The head domain is a GTPase G domain. The neck is made up of three bundle signaling elements (BSEs). The trunk, which forms the stalk of the protein, involves two units which participate in three different interface interactions. One interface interaction allows for two monomers to associate into dimers whose assembly is promoted at hydrophobic patches in the stalks of each Drp1. Another interaction allows for two dimers to associate into tetramers, and the third interaction allows for tetramers to associate into higher order oligomers. While Drp1 is not localized to the mitochondrial membrane, it is able to associate with the mitochondrial membrane via interactions with several adaptor proteins. In yeast cells (which are a frequent model for studying mitochondrial fission), the adaptor protein Fis1 is an outer membrane protein and associates with Mdv1 and Caf4, which in turn recruit Drp1. The mammalian FIS1 protein does not play a role in fission but instead is involved in mitophagy. In human cells, there are four adaptor proteins for Drp1, these being FIS1, MiD49, MiD51, and MFF. In contrast, MIEF1 when bound to Drp1 might prevent mitochondrial fission and thus shift the balance towards fusion of mitochondria. Regulation of Drp1 occurs through phosphorylation of its Ser616 and Ser637 residues. Phosphorylation of Ser616 promotes activity of Drp1 and therefore fission, whereas phosphorylation of Ser637 inhibits Drp1. Calcineurin is capable of dephosphorylating the Ser637 site, activated by rising levels of calcium ions.

The mitochondria forms a contact site with the endoplasmic reticulum (ER), and the ER in turn associates with the mitochondria to form preconstriction sites which are necessary but insufficient for mitochondrial fission to take place. Inverted formin 2 (INF2), a protein localized on the ER, and with the help of SPIRE1C localized on the mitochondria, causes actin to polymerize where bundles of actin diagonally cross each other and recruit myosin II, which assists in localizing Drp1 onto mitochondria. Actin bundles are reservoirs of Drp1 proteins and their polymerization helps enable provide a pool of Drp1 proteins to assemble onto the mitochondria. Actin polymerzation also helps trigger a calcium ion influx from the ER and into the mitochondria, which results in the dephosphorylation of the Ser637 residue on Drp1 and then a scission that cleaves the inner mitochondrial membrane will.  Drp1 most commonly forms rings of 16 monomers around the mitochondrial membrane, and this in turn deeply constricts the membrane. Several 16-unit Drp1 rings can assemble and form helical structures that tubulate the mitochondrial membrane. Nearby rings of Drp1 will experience interactions between their G domains (or G-G interactions). G-G interactions reposition catalytic sites to cause GTP hydrolysis, and GTP hydrolysis leads to conformational changes that further assist in the final separation at the constriction site to produce two different mitochondria. The exact process by which the final separation takes place is not yet fully understood.

Role of other organelles
PI(4)P needs to be delivered to the mitochondrial membrane and is necessary for fission to proceed. One mode of delivery of PI(4)P to the mitochondria-ER contact sites is from the Golgi apparatus. Golgi contain ARF1 proteins localized on their membranes, which are capable of recruiting kinases that trigger the synthesis of PI(4)P. PI(4)P is then delivered through a vesicle to mitochondria-ER contact sites. Lysosomes are also often involved in but not necessary for mitochondrial fission. Contact between mitochondria and lysosomes are possible because the Rab7 protein can both form associates with lysosomes and a protein embedded on the outer mitochondrial membrane called TBC1D15. Before fission proceeds, Rab7 will dissociate from lysosomes by hydrolyzing GTP. Contact between the ER and lysosomes also takes place and these contacts also depend on Rab7. A subset of these contacts is also mediated by oxysterol binding protein related protein 1L (ORP1L). ORP1L forms associations with lysosomes  via Rab7 and also forms associations with ER via VAMP-associated proteins (VAPs). Overall, this allows for three-way contact between the mitochondria, ER, and lysosomes. The ER recruits lysosomes only after Drp1 has already been recruited (whereas Drp1 itself is recruited after the preconstriction takes place). ORP1L is also required in the transfer of PI(4)P from lysosomes to the mitochondria. PI(4)P is therefore delivered to the mitochondria from both Golgi and lysosomes, and it is possible (though not currently known) that the two organelles provide PI(4)P for different purposes during fission or at different steps in the process, or whether they contribute PI(4)P for entirely distinct forms of mitochondrial fission.

Peripheral and Midzone Division
Recent findings suggest that mitochondria undergo two different mechanisms of fission. In an elongated mitochondrial network, mitochondria are capable of dividing near the center (at the midzone) or towards one of the two ends (or the periphery). Midzone division and peripheral division in mitochondrial networks appears to be involved in two different cellular activities. Midzone division is promoted by biogenesis, when the cell is proliferating and more mitochondria are needed. Peripheral division results in the removal of damaged mitochondrial units from the network formed at the periphery, these mitochondria being destined for autophagy (or mitophagy), destined for destruction. Peripheral division appears to be preceded by elevated concentrations of reactive oxygen species and reduced membrane potential and pH. These two types of fission appear to be regulated by different molecular mechanisms. The adaptor protein FIS1 appears to be the involved adaptor protein recruiting Drp1 in peripheral division, whereas the adaptor MFF seems to be the involved adaptor protein recruiting Drp1 during midzone division. On the other hand, MiD49 and MiD51 appear to both be involved in both forms of division. Furthermore, the lysosomal contact sites with mitochondria only appear during peripheral division.

See also 
 Mitochondrial fusion
 Binary fission

References 

Mitochondrial genetics
Cell anatomy